Junpei Eto (25 March 1898 – 16 November 1987) was a Japanese painter. His work was part of the painting event in the art competition at the 1932 Summer Olympics.

References

1898 births
1987 deaths
20th-century Japanese painters
Japanese painters
Olympic competitors in art competitions
People from Ōita Prefecture